Niobium forms two stable fluorides:

 Niobium(IV) fluoride
 Niobium(V) fluoride

Niobium compounds
Fluorine compounds